The United Church of God, an International Association (UCGIA or simply UCG) is a nontrinitarian, nondenominational Christian church based in the United States.

UCG calls itself "The United Church of God, an International Association", with the last three words italicized in order to differentiate UCG from local congregations and denominations which bear similar names. UCG was organized in 1995 by churches that had been part of the Worldwide Church of God, and holds doctrines and beliefs similar to those taught by Herbert W. Armstrong and the former Worldwide Church of God.

Government
UCG is governed by a 12-man board called the "Council of Elders" that is elected by the church's paid and lay ministers, which form the "General Conference of Elders."  The General Conference of Elders meets once a year in May to perform tasks including budget approval, operational planning, strategic planning, electing members of the church council, and participation in seminars. The council acts as the governing body for the international association and is responsible for forming policy and doctrine for the Church. The council meets four times a year.

UCG's international headquarters is referred to as the "Home Office" and is located in Milford, Ohio (a suburb of Cincinnati). This office is headed by UCG's president, who is the church's official spokesperson and is charged with administrative responsibility over day-to-day functions, such as managing the church's paid ministry and producing literature or other publications. The president is appointed by the Council of Elders (COE) and can be removed from his appointment by the COE. The COE must remain in the confidence of the General Conference of Elders, and COE members serve on a rotating system of election wherein four of twelve men are up for re-election or replacement in any given year.

Fundamental beliefs

The UCG follows and believes in many of the basic doctrinal principles of Christian churches, such as the inspiration of the scriptures, Christ's bodily resurrection, and the three ordinances of baptism, and agrees with Protestant theology regarding the tenets of sola scriptura and that justification is a gift given freely by God. However, its teachings differ from mainstream Christian (Catholic, Orthodox and Protestant) theology in a number of key areas: The fundamental beliefs of the United Church of God are as follows: God the Father, Jesus Christ and the Holy Spirit. The Word of God. Satan the Devil. Humanity. Sin and God's Law. The Sacrifice of Jesus Christ. Three Days and Three Nights. Repentance. Water Baptism. The Sabbath Day. The Passover. The Festivals of God. God's Food Laws. Military Service and War. Promises to Abraham. God's Purpose for Mankind. The Church. Tithing. The Resurrections. Jesus Christ's Return.

 God the Father, Jesus Christ and the Holy Spirit: The official position of UCG on the nature of God resembles that of Binitarians. The Holy Spirit is the spirit/power of God and of Christ Jesus rather than a separate person in the Godhead. God 'the Father' and Jesus Christ are viewed as two distinct beings in the 'God family'; Nevertheless, they are viewed as sharing in perfect union and oneness. In a 2005 doctrinal paper approved by the UCG council of Elders, the Hebrew word echad used in Deuteronomy 6:4, “Hear, O Israel: The Lord our God, the Lord is one!” is contrasted with the Hebrew word yachid when referring to the oneness of God. A paragraph taken from the organizations sixty-four page doctrinal paper on “The Nature of God and Christ” states: "So what is the meaning of echad? According to Gensenius’ Hebrew-Chaldee Lexicon, echad means “to unite, to join together, to be in unity.” Echad also conveys the idea of  being “bound together” like the cords of a rope. The tighter the cords are bound, the greater the strength produced. Echad does indeed mean “one” but it is a oneness that is produced by a collective unity. This idea of collective unity is clearly demonstrated in Genesis 2:23-24, “And Adam said: ‘This is now bone of my bones and flesh of my flesh; she shall be called Woman, because she was taken out of Man.’ Therefore, a man shall leave his father and mother and be joined to his wife, and they shall become one [echad] flesh.” Here two distinct individuals are “one” flesh. This is not talking about one in number but one in collective unity, harmony, peace, and the sharing of common goals. Adam and Eve were joined, twisted, bound and wrapped together in singleness of purpose." Both God the Father and the Word (Jesus Christ) are viewed as uncreated, coeternal, and of the same spiritual essence.
 The Word of God: Both the Old and New Testaments preserve God’s divine revelation to humanity and are his “complete expressed will to humanity.” In agreement with 2 Timothy 3:16, all scripture is inspired by God. UCG also holds that scripture is infallible in its original writing and the final authority in a person's life. There is no doctrine regarding the type of translation one must use.
 Satan the Devil: Satan is the ultimate adversary of God and, by extension, man. He is the deceiver and accuser of man who has temporarily been given limited power over the world by God.
 Humanity: Humans are created in the image of God with the potential to be children in God's family. Mankind was formed from the dust of the ground and given the breath of life by God. Humans are mortal, and do not possess an immortal soul.
 Sin and God's Law: Sin is defined as transgression of God's law. Sin, introduced to humanity in the garden of Eden, withholds God's gift of eternal life from mankind. Only through the forgiveness of sins, by God's grace, will a person receive eternal life. However, despite God's grace, open rejection of God's law and a return to sinful ways will ultimately lead to death.
 The Sacrifice of Jesus Christ: The sacrifice of Jesus Christ is the foundation of Christianity. Jesus gave His life for all mankind so that we might live, freed from the penalty of sin.
 Three Days and Three Nights: In accordance with his prophecy concerning himself, Christ would be raised after three days and three nights, literally. UCG holds that Christ died on Wednesday afternoon and was raised shortly before sunset on Saturday.
 Repentance: Repentance is a major part of conversion and is necessary for true conversion into God's family.
 Water Baptism: The United Church of God holds baptism as an important ordinance for all Christians. Complete immersion is the only form of water baptism accepted by UCG. Baptism must be preceded by faith and repentance and represents a believers death and newness of life in Christ Jesus. Baptism is considered an outward expression of an inward conversion. Infant baptism is strongly discouraged, as only those who fully understand and appreciate what baptism symbolizes are baptized. The baptism ceremony is followed by the “laying on of hands” where a believer is believed to receive the Holy Spirit.
 The Sabbath Day: The Sabbath day, as a day set aside by God, was established at creation, given to Israel in the ten commandments, and made for all mankind. Members hallow the Sabbath by worshipping and resting on the Seventh day.
 Passover: members of UCG observe the Passover meal every 14th of Abib, imitating Christ's last supper. The Passover meal, the bread and the wine, are viewed as a reminder of Christ's sacrifice. The Passover ceremony, which consists of the bread, the wine, and footwashing, is observed once a year.
Belief concerning the Festivals of God: UCG observes seven annual Holy Days (annual Sabbaths): Passover, Feast of Unleavened Bread, Feast of Pentecost, Feast of Trumpets, Day of Atonement, Feast of Tabernacles, and The Last Great Day.
 Food Laws: According to the teaching of UCG, God's food laws were established before the formation of Israel and are therefore still binding to Christians today. Evidence of their continuing importance is believed to be found in the example of Jesus’ and His disciples’ abstinence of biblically unclean meats.
 Military Service and War: UCG holds that Christians are forbidden by the commandments of God from taking a life. Christians are viewed as being called out of this world, having their citizenship in heaven, and discouraged from participating too closely in worldly affairs. John 18:36 is often used to defend this position, “Jesus stated, ‘My kingdom is not of this world. If My kingdom were of this world, then My servants fight…’ ” Also, because most militaries require you to sign away certain rights, UCG strongly dissuades members from enlisting and voluntarily giving away their freedom to serve God to the best of their ability.
 Promises to Abraham: UCG holds that people of Western European descent, primarily the original British colonies and the United States, are direct physical descendants of the Ten Lost Tribes of the northern kingdom of ancient Israel, whereas the historical Jews (and modern-day Israel) are descendants of the ancient southern kingdom of Judah. This belief is not used to assert racial or ethnic superiority, but solely to interpret End Time prophecies which are believed to be directed at the United States and Europe.
 God’s Purpose for Mankind: The purpose of mankind is to prepare us to become part of God’s family. UCG holds that Christians are ultimately begotten as children in the Family of God and will at their resurrection become "spirit-born divine beings who are part of Elohim, the universe-ruling family of God (see Divinization (Christian))."
 The Church: The church is defined as the body of believers that have received, and are being guided by, the Holy Spirit. UCG stresses the importance of the name Church of God and identifier of God's true church.
 Tithing: In accordance with Old Testament writings, UCG encourages members to tithe, which in Greek and Hebrew meant “to give or take the tenth of all increase” (not necessarily a tenth of total income). Members are also taught to set aside a second tithe, an additional 10 percent for their own personal use in observing the church's annual religious festivals, particularly the Feast of Tabernacles.
 Resurrections: At Christ's return, those who have lived in Christ will be resurrected to spiritual life. Those who do not know or understand the truth of the Bible during their lifetimes will be given time to learn these teachings after the "Second Resurrection" to a new physical life. After living again in the Millennial world under God's Kingdom, those who continue to reject God's Holy Spirit and way of life will be annihilated after the "Third Resurrection" along with unrepentant former believers who had turned away from God. They are destroyed in the third resurrection (the "resurrection of fire") in the Lake of Fire, along with Satan and his demons.
 Jesus Christ's Return: UCG teaches a “personal, visible, premillennial return of the Lord Jesus Christ.” They believe Jesus taught the coming of a literal earthly Kingdom and that people who are 'saved' will not immediately go to heaven upon dying, but will be raised on the last day and live and rule eternally with Jesus Christ on earth after his second coming. UCG also asserts that the final destination of the unrepentant wicked is not everlasting torture, but annihilation or permanent destruction.

Other doctrines
 Alcohol consumption in moderation is permitted but the UCG does teach against the misuse of alcohol.
 Belief in Restorationism. Like many churches in the Restorationist movement, UCG believes that a number of today's mainstream Christian teachings resulted from doctrinal corruption under the influence of Greco-Roman philosophy, Gnosticism, Anti-Semitism, and mistranslation which occurred early in the history of the church. Much of UCG doctrine that is distinct from mainstream Christianity is the outgrowth of an effort to separate these influences and traditions from what is believed to be the beliefs and practices of Jesus Christ and the original Apostolic church. UCG holds that the Roman Catholic church and most Protestant denominations today have mistakenly syncretized various pagan doctrines and practices. For example, UCG teaches that the ancient pagan origins of traditional Christian celebrations (especially Christmas, Halloween, Easter, and Valentine's Day) render them inappropriate for true Christians.

Ambassador Bible College
Ambassador Bible College (ABC) is an intensive nine-month educational program focusing on the Bible, Christian living and the fundamental doctrines of the United Church of God. The program seeks to prepare young adults for leadership and service, and to begin preparing them for the duty of teaching future generations. The curriculum thoroughly examines doctrine and leads students systematically through the books of the Bible.

Mission and media
UCG states: "The mission of the Church of God is to preach the gospel of Jesus Christ and the Kingdom of God in all the world, make disciples in all nations and care for those disciples." Emphasis is consequently placed on the proclamation of "The Kingdom of God" to the general public, which is accomplished through various media, ranging from Twitter and YouTube to more traditional forms such as radio, print and television.

UCG publishes and produces the following:
Beyond Today magazine (formerly The Good News) is UCG's flagship publication. It is a free magazine and is published bi-monthly. The magazine contains articles that discuss Bible prophecy, world news and trends, social issues, church doctrine and Christian living.
 The Beyond Today Television Program airs on WGN America and the WORD Network and is shown on a further 28 Public-access television cable TV stations and is accompanied by a multimedia website and a presence on YouTube and a dedicated Roku channel.
Compass Check (formerly Vertical Thought) is a quarterly publication published for youth. The publication contains articles from both church ministers and youth, and aims to strengthen the Christian faith of its readership.
The United News is a newsletter which focuses on news and events within the United Church of God. The newsletter contains articles on UCG missions, church activities, reports on church governance, doctrinal and Christian living articles, and birth and death announcements of church members.
In addition to the above publications, the UCG has produced 53 booklets on various biblical topics, a 12-lesson Bible study course, a monthly systematic Bible reading program with commentary, various article reprints, local public-access television programs, and a website.  A series of presentations called the Kingdom of God Bible seminars began in September 2011 and are held at different locations around the world.

See also
 Christian observances of Jewish holidays
 Christian views on the Old Covenant
 Restorationism

References

External links
United Church of God – official web site
Beyond Today magazine
Compass Check magazine
Members site

Church of God (Armstrong)
Church of God denominations
Christian denominations established in the 20th century
Christian organizations established in 1995
Nontrinitarian denominations